Henrietta Christie (born 23 January 2002) is a New Zealand professional racing cyclist, who currently rides for UCI Women's Team . In September 2021, Christie won the young rider classification at the 2021 Tour Cycliste Féminin International de l'Ardèche in France.

Major results
Sources:
2019
 Oceania Junior Road Championships
3rd  Time trial
6th Road race
 3rd National Junior Road Championships Time trial
2020
 National Junior Road Championships
1st  Time trial
2nd Road race
2021
 National Under-23 Road Championships
1st  Time trial
2nd Road race
 1st  Young rider classification Tour Cycliste Féminin International de l'Ardèche
 7th Gravel and Tar La Femme
2022
 National Under-23 Road Championships
2nd Road race
3rd Time trial

References

External links

2002 births
Living people
New Zealand female cyclists
Sportspeople from Wellington City
21st-century New Zealand women